Eulimella smithii is a species of sea snail, a marine gastropod mollusk in the family Pyramidellidae, the pyrams and their allies.

Distribution
This species occurs in the following locations:
 North West Atlantic

Notes
Additional information regarding this species:
 Distribution: Range: 40.05°N to 13°N; 82°W to 59.6°W. Distribution: USA: Massachusetts, Florida; Florida: West Florida; Barbados

References

External links
 To Biodiversity Heritage Library (4 publications)
 To Encyclopedia of Life
 To ITIS
 To World Register of Marine Species

smithii
Gastropods described in 1880